450, Chemin du Golf is a Canadian French language sitcom previously aired on TQS. The show revolves around how a suburban neighbourhood is turned upside-down when someone new moves into the area. The series stars François Massicotte, a well-known Québécois. The title of the show refers to the 450 area code that is used for most of the suburbs off the island of Montreal.

References

2000s Canadian sitcoms
Television shows filmed in Quebec
Noovo original programming
2003 Canadian television series debuts
2009 Canadian television series endings